Pleasant Valley is an unincorporated community in Allegany County, Maryland, United States.

References

Unincorporated communities in Allegany County, Maryland
Unincorporated communities in Maryland